Union Investment (formal name Union Asset Management Holding AG) is the investment arm of the DZ Bank Group and part of the cooperative financial services network. It was founded in 1956 and is headquartered in Frankfurt.

Trading in open-end funds occurs in part through the 1,101 credit unions in Germany (Volksbanken Raiffeisenbanken Co-operative, including Sparda-Banks, PSD-banks, etc.) and in part through the external services of Bausparkasse Schwäbisch Hall AG, DZ Bank Group's building society.

The primary shareholders in Union Investment are DZ Bank with 54.44% and WGZ Bank (the central bank of the credit unions in the Rhineland and Westphalia) with 17.72%. Other shareholders include BBBank and the credit unions through their membership associations.

, Union Investment has self-declared assets under management of approximately 368.2 billion euro.

Subsidiaries
Union Asset Management Holding AG has 15 subsidiaries, including:
 Attrax S.A. in Luxembourg for funds brokerage, distribution, share administration and custody services
 Union Investment Institutional GmbH for institutional clients
 Union Investment Institutional Property for institutional property investments
 Union Investment Luxembourg S.A. in Luxembourg
 Union Investment Privatfonds GmbH offers open-end funds to private investors
 Union Investment Real Estate GmbH (formerly DIFA Deutsche Immobilien Fonds AG) is the second largest German property investment association
 Quoniam Asset Management GmbH follows a quantitative approach to investment and manages funds for institutional clients

History
The Union-Investment-Gesellschaft mbH was the third German investment association to be founded, on 26 January 1956, by 14 credit unions. The UniFonds stock fund was created the same year as its first open-end fund. The first offering of investment vehicles outside Germany was in 1961, in Belgium.

Co op Immobilienfonds Verwaltung AG was founded in Hamburg in 1965 and in 1980 renamed Deutsche Immobilien Fonds AG or DIFA. The initial stockholders were the Central Institute of Consumer Cooperatives and the Bank für Gemeinwirtschaft. In 1966 DIFA launched an open-end property fund, Co op Immobilienfonds, later renamed DIFA-Fonds Nr. 1 (DIFA Fund No. 1). Starting on 15 January 2007, DIFA did business under the name Union Investment Real Estate AG; in 2009 it was converted to a GmbH.

Since 1967, Union Investment has offered management of investment accounts. In 1968, it offered its first retirement fund, UniRenta. In 1969, it reached a fund capitalization of 1 billion DM.

Union Investment Luxembourg S.A. was founded in 1988. The total capitalization of the group was now 10 billion DM.

In April 1994 Union Investment began offering stock-based wealth management with three strategic variants: chance, growth and security. In 1996 it introduced stock-based life insurance under the name Opti Plan.

The holding company Union-Fonds-Holding AG was founded in 1999 and changed its name in July 2002 to Union Asset Management Holding AG.

Distinctions
In March 2013 Union Investment became the first investment association to be awarded five stars eleven times in a row in the investment funds guide of the German business magazine Capital.

References

External links
 Union Investment website 

Financial services companies established in 1956
Investment companies of Germany
1956 establishments in West Germany
Companies based in Frankfurt
German companies established in 1956